San Bernardino is a village in Kanasín Municipality, in the state of Yucatán, Mexico.

References

Populated places in Yucatán